Gartrell is a surname and, less often, a given name. Notable people with the name include:

Surname 
Amy Gartrell (born 1974), American artist
Charles H. Gartrell (1914–1988), American state and municipal officer from Ashland, Kentucky
Frederick Gartrell (1914–1987), Anglican priest in the second half of the 20th century
Herbert William Gartrell (1882–1945), South Australian professor of mining and metallurgy at the University of Adelaide
James Gartrell, founding partner of G. Wood, Son & Co. in Adelaide in 1876
Lucius Jeremiah Gartrell (1821–1891), American politician and lawyer, general in the Confederate States Army during the American Civil War
Nanette Gartrell, MD, American psychiatrist, researcher, lesbian activist and writer
Robert Gartrell (born 1962), Australian cricketer
Stacey Gartrell (born 1977), freestyle long-distance swimmer from Australia
Tharin Gartrell, American allegedly involved in a 2008 Barack Obama assassination plot
Tim Gartrell (born 1970), Secretary of the Australian Labor Party

Given name 

 Gartrell Johnson (born 1986), American football running back

See also
Gartrell v. Stafford, 12 Neb. 545, 11 N.W. 732 (1882) is a frequently cited 1882 decision of the Nebraska Supreme Court
Gartel